To-Day is a 1917 silent film drama directed by Ralph Ince and starring Florence Reed. A story about prostitution, this film is based on a 1913 stage play Today by George Broadhurst and Abraham S. Schomer and starred Emily Stevens which ran for an astounding 280 performances in eight months time. Actors Gus Weinburg and Alice Gale are the only actors in the film that appeared in the play. It is considered to be a lost film.<ref>AFI Catalog of Feature Films: 1911-20 by The American Film Institute, c. 1988</ref>The Library of Congress American Silent Feature Film Survival Catalog: To-Day

It was remade as the early sound picture Today (1930) by Majestic Pictures starring Conrad Nagel and Catherine Dale Owen.

Cast
Florence Reed - Lily Morton
Frank Mills - Fred Morton (*this Frank R. Mills 1867/?1870-1921)
Gus Weinberg - Henry Morton
Alice Gale - Emma Morton
Leonore Harris - Marion Garland (billed as Lenore Harris)
Harry Lambart - Richard Hewlett (billed as Captain Harry Lambert)
Kate Lester - Mrs. Farington

Reception
Like many American films of the time, To-Day'' was subject to cuts by city and state film censorship boards. The Chicago Board of Censors refused to issue a permit as the film features the downfall of a woman through her infidelity and leading an immoral life.

References

External links

To-Day; allmovie.com/ synopsis
Lantern slide announcing the coming of the film; and distribution through Pioneer Film Corporation(Wayback Machine)

1917 films
American silent feature films
American films based on plays
Films directed by Ralph Ince
Lost American films
1917 drama films
Silent American drama films
Films produced by Harry Rapf
American black-and-white films
1917 lost films
Lost drama films
1910s American films